"Then You Turn Away" is a song by English electronic band Orchestral Manoeuvres in the Dark (OMD), released as the third single released from their eighth studio album, Sugar Tax (1991), on 2 September 1991. It peaked at number 50 on the UK Singles Chart the same month and also reached number 56 in Germany.

B-sides
Originally the music written by Andy McCluskey for the 1991 BBC G. F. Newman TV series For the Greater Good was to be included as the B-side for "Then You Turn Away", but it became Sugar Tax. This song in turn was scheduled as the title track of the album, but was not finished at the time the album was released.

The CD singles contain the extra tracks "Area", "Vox Humana", and a remix of "Then You Turn Away", called Infinite Repeat Mix. "Vox Humana" uses a sample of a female Gregorian chant written by Hildegard of Bingen.

Track listings
7-inch and cassette single
 "Then You Turn Away"
 "Sugar Tax"

CD1
 "Then You Turn Away"
 "Sugar Tax"
 "Area"
 "Then You Turn Away" (Infinite Repeat mix)

CD2
 "Then You Turn Away"
 "Sailing on the Seven Seas"
 "Then You Turn Away" (Infinite Repeat mix)
 "Vox Humana"

Charts

References

External links
 Lyrics

1990 songs
1991 singles
Orchestral Manoeuvres in the Dark songs
Songs written by Andy McCluskey
Songs written by Stuart Kershaw
Virgin Records singles